Yu-Cheng Chang (born 18 August 1995) is a Taiwanese professional baseball infielder for the Boston Red Sox of Major League Baseball (MLB). He has previously played in MLB for the Cleveland Indians / Guardians, Pittsburgh Pirates, and Tampa Bay Rays.

Professional career

Minor leagues
Chang signed with the Indians in 2013 as an international free agent for a $500,000 signing bonus. He made his professional debut in 2014 with the Arizona League Indians of the Rookie-level Arizona League, where he batted .346 with six home runs, 25 runs batted in (RBIs), and a .986 on-base plus slugging (OPS) in 42 games played. He spent the 2015 season with the Lake County Captains of the Class A Midwest League, where he posted a .232 average with nine home runs and 52 RBIs in 105 games. In 2016, while playing for the Lynchburg Hillcats of the Class A-Advanced Carolina League, Chang was named an all-star. He was reported to be involved in a trade to the Milwaukee Brewers for Jonathan Lucroy during the 2016 season; however, the trade fell apart after Lucroy would not waive his no-trade clause.

Chang finished the 2016 season with a .259 batting average with 13 home runs and 70 RBIs in 109 games. In 2017, Chang played for the Akron RubberDucks of the Class AA Eastern League, where he hit .220, along with a .461 slugging percentage, with a career-high 24 home runs and 66 RBIs in 126 games. The Indians added him to their 40-man roster after the season.

MLB.com ranked Chang as Cleveland's sixth-best prospect going into the 2018 season. He spent the 2018 season with the Columbus Clippers of the Class AAA International League, batting .256 with 13 home runs and 62 RBIs in 127 games. He returned to Columbus to begin the 2019 season.

Cleveland Indians / Guardians
On 28 June 2019, the Indians promoted Chang to the major leagues. He debuted that night against the Baltimore Orioles, starting at third base. On 25 August, Chang hit his first career hit and triple against the Kansas City Royals, against starter Eric Skoglund in the third inning and reliever Scott Barlow in the seventh inning. On 9 September, he hit his first major league home run, a three-run homer, against Los Angeles Angels reliever Justin Anderson. Overall with the 2019 Cleveland Indians, Chang batted .178 with one home run and six RBIs in 28 games.

Chang played in 10 games during the shortened 2020 season, batting .182 with no home runs and one RBI. Chang started at first base for Cleveland on Opening Day in 2021. He hit his first home run of the season on 5 June, a three-run shot off Baltimore Orioles reliever Adam Plutko. Chang finished the 2021 season with nine home runs and 39 RBIs while batting .228 over 89 games.

Chang appeared in four games for Cleveland during the 2022 season; he was 0-for-10 at the plate while striking out seven times. He was designated for assignment on 26 May 2022.

Pittsburgh Pirates
On 30 May 2022, the Guardians traded Chang to the Pittsburgh Pirates for cash considerations. In 18 games with the Pirates, he batted .167 with one home run and two RBIs while appearing defensively at first base and second base. He was designated for assignment on 30 June.

Tampa Bay Rays
On 5 July 2022, the Tampa Bay Rays claimed Chang off waivers from the Pirates. He was promoted to the Rays' major-league roster on 8 July. In 36 games with the Rays, he batted .260 with three home runs and 12 RBIs, while appearing at every infield position and also pitching two innings. On 9 September, Chang was designated for assignment.

Boston Red Sox
On 12 September 2022, the Boston Red Sox claimed Chang off waivers from the Rays. He was added to Boston's major-league roster two days later. In 11 games with the Red Sox, he batted .150 (3-for-20) with one RBI, and made defensive appearances at first base, second base, and shortstop. Overall during the 2022 season, Chang appeared in 51 MLB games for four different teams, batting .222 with three home runs and 13 RBIs. On 18 November, Chang was non-tendered by the Red Sox and became a free agent. 

The Red Sox re-signed Chang to a one-year, major league contract on 16 February 2023.

International career
Chang was selected to the Chinese Taipei national baseball team (Taiwan) roster for the 2023 World Baseball Classic. He initially declined to play for the national team, preferring to prepare for the upcoming MLB season. The decision garnered widespread backlash from Taiwanese fans, who labelled Chang a "military deserter"; he previously had been exempted from compulsory military service in exchange for representing Taiwan in the 2019 Asian Baseball Championship and other international competitions. Chang reversed his decision on 3 Jan, pledging to play for Taiwan "if selected."

At the 2023 tournament, Chang emerged as the breakout player on the Chinese Taipei roster. In a nod to the controversy surrounding his military exemption, he became known for saluting after reaching base; fans nicknamed him "the Minister of Defense." Despite his team failing to reach the quarterfinals, Chang was named the most valuable player of Pool A after batting .438 (7-for-16) with two home runs and 8 RBIs in four games.

Personal life
Chang is from the Amis people, an Indigenous Austronesian ethnic group in Taiwan. He and his wife, Ling, have one son.

See also
 List of Major League Baseball players from Taiwan

Notes

References

External links

1995 births
Living people
People from Taitung County
Taiwanese expatriate baseball players in the United States
Major League Baseball infielders
Major League Baseball players from Taiwan
Cleveland Indians players
Cleveland Guardians players
Pittsburgh Pirates players
Tampa Bay Rays players
Boston Red Sox players
Akron RubberDucks players
Arizona League Indians players
Columbus Clippers players
Glendale Desert Dogs players
Lake County Captains players
Lynchburg Hillcats players
Mesa Solar Sox players
Amis people
2023 World Baseball Classic players